The Australian sharpnose shark (Rhizoprionodon taylori) is a requiem shark, belonging to the family Carcharhinidae. It is found in the tropical waters of the western Pacific Ocean off Papua New Guinea and northern Australia, between latitudes 8°N and 28°S, from the surface to a depth of 110 m. It can grow up to a length around 70 cm.

References

 
 International Union for Conservation of Nature and Natural Resources,  Red List of Threatened Species,  2003

Rhizoprionodon
Viviparous fish
Fish described in 1915